Edelgard Elspeth Mahant is a Canadian academic, who teaches political science at York University's Glendon College in Toronto, Ontario and University of Botswana.

She formerly taught at Laurentian University in Sudbury, Ontario, where she was also the Ontario Liberal Party candidate in the electoral district of Sudbury East in the 1985 provincial election.

Education
She completed her studies at the Universities of British Columbia (BA) and Toronto (MA) and obtained her PhD at the London School of Economics and Political Science with a thesis titled "French and German Attitudes to the Establishment  of the European Economic Community, 1955-1957".

Areas of expertise
Mahant is specialized in foreign policy, including the politics of the European Union, Free trade and International Relations.

She has cowritten two books on Canada-United States relations with historian Graeme S. Mount:
An introduction to Canadian-American relations Graeme S. Mount, Edelgard E. Mahant. Methuen, London 1984 
Invisible and inaudible in Washington: American policies toward Canada Graeme S. Mount, Edelgard E. Mahant. UBC Press, Vancouver 1999  

Other books
Mahant is also the author of several other books and publications:
 Grandma's Gone to Africa. One Woman's Journey to Botswana the Good Toronto: EP2M Enterprises, 2016..
 Darfur to Taipei. Cases in Foreign Policy Analysis Edelgard Mahant and Bodistean, eds Toronto: Glendon College, 2015 
Free trade in American-Canadian relations Edelgard E. Mahant. Krieger 1993  
Birthmarks of Europe: the origins of the European Community reconsidered Edelgard E. Mahant. Ashgate 2004

References

Canadian political scientists
Academic staff of York University
University of Toronto alumni
Ontario Liberal Party candidates in Ontario provincial elections
Year of birth missing (living people)
Living people
Women in Ontario politics
Academic staff of the University of Botswana
Women political scientists